Harry Pitts (27 June 1861 – 30 April 1897)  was the first person to be killed by a terrorist attack on the London Underground.

Pitts died of injuries received from a bomb which exploded at Aldersgate Station (now Barbican) on 26 April 1897. The bomb was planted by Russian anarchists in revenge for one of their members being given a seven-year prison sentence. At an inquest into Pitts death a verdict of "wilful murder against person or persons unknown" was recorded.

Pitts was born in Bradninch, Devon the son of a millwright. He briefly spent some time in Lancashire before settling in Tottenham, North London. He was married and had two daughters.

References

1861 births
1897 deaths
People from Tiverton, Devon
History of the London Underground
Deaths by improvised explosive device